This is a list of destinations served or previously served by Corsair International :

List

References

Lists of airline destinations